Selaparang may refer to:

Selaparang, a district of the city of Mataram, on the Indonesian island of Lombok, the capital of West Nusa Tenggara province
Selaparang Airport, was the sole airport serving the island of Lombok and the city of Mataram. Now replaced by the Lombok International Airport